First Congregational Church of Bay Shore is a historic Congregational church complex at 1860 Union Boulevard(SCR 50) on the corner of First Street at Bay Shore, Suffolk County, New York, United States.  Contributing elements of the complex consists of three attached units: the 1891 Romanesque Revival / Shingle Style church and rectory. The church is a cruciform plan, gable roofed structure that features a square bell tower and porte cochere. The interior of the church features a variation on the Akron plan configuration. It was designed by Stephenson & Greene of New York.

It was added to the National Register of Historic Places in 2002.

References

External links

First Congregational Church of Bay Shore Official Website

Churches on the National Register of Historic Places in New York (state)
Queen Anne architecture in New York (state)
Churches completed in 1891
19th-century churches in the United States
Churches in Suffolk County, New York
Akron Plan church buildings
National Register of Historic Places in Suffolk County, New York
Congregational churches in New York (state)